A queen mother is a former queen, often a queen dowager, who is the mother of the reigning monarch. The term has been used in English since the early 1560s. It arises in hereditary monarchies in Europe and is also used to describe a number of similar yet distinct monarchical concepts in non-European cultures around the world.

" Queen Mother" usually, in English, refers to Queen Elizabeth The Queen Mother (queen consort, 1936–1952; queen mother, 1952–2002), who was the mother of Queen Elizabeth II and one of the few people to use the term as an official style. However, it is also used as an official title in Thailand where Sirikit, the mother of the present king, is officially styled "The Queen Mother".

Status
A queen mother is often a queen dowager, a widow of a king, who is simultaneously a former queen consort and the mother of the current monarch. As there is only one monarch, there can only be one queen mother.

It is unclear if a queen consort whose husband abdicates the throne, or a queen regnant who abdicates, and is the mother of the current monarch would be the queen mother. In many countries, such as the United Kingdom, a monarch loses the title of king or queen after abdication. For example, Juliana of the Netherlands, who abdicated and was succeeded by her daughter Beatrix, was sometimes colloquially referred to as the queen mother despite declining the title and having reverted to being a princess. Queen Paola of Belgium, whose husband Albert II abdicated but retained the title of king, has generally been referred to as the queen mother of Philippe despite not being a queen dowager.

A former queen consort who is the grandmother of the reigning monarch is sometimes called the queen grandmother. Savang Vadhana of Thailand was known by this style.

United Kingdom

The title "queen mother" evolved to distinguish a queen dowager from all other queens when she is also the mother of the reigning sovereign. Thus, upon the death of her husband, King George V, Queen Mary became queen mother, retaining the status throughout the reigns of her sons, Edward VIII and George VI.

The title also distinguishes former queens consort from those who are simply the mother of the current monarch. For example, Princess Victoria of Saxe-Coburg-Saalfeld was "the queen's mother" when her daughter Victoria became queen regnant, but she was not "queen mother" as her husband was never a king. The title in British usage is purely a courtesy title. While the wife of a king is called "queen", there is no constitutional or statutory recognition of "queen mother" as a title.

There is no male equivalent to a queen mother (i.e. "king father"). This would occur only if the husband of a queen regnant outlived the queen and was thereafter father to the new king or queen. Such a situation has never occurred. Since the title "queen mother" derives from the woman's previous title of "queen", it would also be incongruous to call such a father of a monarch the "king father", as the husbands of queens regnant are not given the title "king", but rather titled as a prince. The exact title such a person would assume has not been clarified by royal lineage experts. "Prince father" is a possibility.

Ottoman Empire

In the Ottoman Empire, valide sultan or sultana mother was the title held by the mother of a ruling Sultan. The title was first used in the 16th century for Hafsa Sultan, consort of Selim I and mother of Suleiman the Magnificent, superseding the previous title of mehd-i ülya ("cradle of the great").

The second position the most important position in the Ottoman Empire after the sultan himself and being more powerful in hierarchy than Haseki sultan. As the mother to the sultan, by Islamic tradition ("A mother's right is God's right"), the valide sultan would have a significant influence on the affairs of the empire. She had great power in the court and her own rooms (always adjacent to her son's) and state staff. In particular during the 17th century, in a period known as the "Sultanate of Women", a series of incompetent or child sultans raised the role of the valide sultan to new heights.

Ancient Israel
The Israelites had in the Kingdom of Judah a title called "Gebirah" which can be translated to Queen Mother.  The mother of the Jewish Monarch was given high rank and status among the Israelites.

India
In India, a queen (usually styled rani, or in the Muslim tradition, begum) who becomes queen-mother is known in Sanskrit and Hindi as a rajamata - literally, mother of the king/monarch.

Africa

In Eswatini, the queen mother, or Ndlovukati, reigns alongside her son. She serves as a ceremonial figurehead, while her son serves as the administrative head of state. He has absolute power. She is important at festivals such as the annual reed dance ceremony.

In Lesotho, Queen Mamohato Bereng Seeiso became Queen mother when her son King Letsie III became King. She served as Queen Mother until her death.

There are many other queen mothers in Africa,s tribal monarchies most of whom have served as regents to their sons.

In many matrilineal societies of West Africa, such as the Ashanti, the queen mother is the one through whom royal descent is reckoned and thus wields considerable power. One of the greatest leaders of Ashanti was Nana Yaa Asantewaa (1840–1921), who led her subjects against the British Empire during the War of the Golden Stool in 1900.

In more symbolically driven societies such as the kingdoms of the Yoruba peoples, the queen mother may not even be a blood relative of the reigning monarch. She could be a female individual of any age who is vested with the ritual essence of the departed queens in a ceremonial sense, and who is practically regarded as the monarch's mother as a result. A good example of this is Oloye Erelu Kuti I of Lagos, who has been seen as the iya oba or queen mother of every succeeding king of that realm, due to the activities of the three successors to her noble title that have reigned since her demise.

Notable examples
These mothers of monarchs, and others, albeit not always officially so titled have also been considered equal to queen mothers:
Adela of Champagne (1180–1206) France
Adelaide of Aquitaine (996–1004) France
Adelaide of Maurienne (1137–1154) France
Adelaide of Paris (898–901) West Francia
Agnes of Aquitaine (1137–1159) Aragon
Agnes of Brandenburg (1286–1304) Denmark
Alexandra of Denmark (1910–1925) United Kingdom
Aliya bint Ali (1939–1950) Iraq
Amarindra (1810–1826) Siam
Amélie of Orléans (1908–1910) Portugal
Alexandrine of Mecklenburg-Schwerin (1947–1952) Denmark
Anastasia of Kiev (1063–1074) Hungary
Anna Pavlovna of Russia (1849–1865) Netherlands
Anne of Austria (1643–1666) France 
Anne of Kiev (1060–1075) France
Athaliah (c. 842 – 841 BCE) Judah
Augusta of Saxe-Weimar-Eisenach (1888) Prussia
Bathsheba (11th century BC) Israel and Judah
Beatrice of Castile (1279–1303) Portugal
Beatrice of Castile (1357–1359) Portugal
Beatrix of the Netherlands (from 2013) Netherlands
Berengaria of Castile (1217–1246) Castile
Blanche of Castile (1226–1252) France
Blanche of Namur (1343–1362) Norway
Bona Sforza (1548–1557) Poland and Lithuania
Carlota Joaquina of Spain (1825–1830)
Catherine de' Medici (1559–1589) France
Catherine of Lancaster (1406–1418) Castile
Catherine of Valois (1401–1437) England
Charlotte of Savoy (1483) France
Charlotte Amalie of Hesse-Kassel (1699–1714) Denmark and Norway
Christina Hvide (1195–1200) Sweden
Christina of Denmark (1167–1170) Sweden
Christina of Holstein-Gottorp (1611–1625) Sweden
Christina of Saxony (1513–1521) Denmark and Norway
Clementia of Hungary (1316) France
Constance of Aragon (1204–1205) Hungary
Constance of Arles (1031–1032) France
Constance of Hungary (1230–1240) Bohemia
Constance of Portugal (1312–1313) Castile and León
Constance of Sicily (1285–1302) Aragon and Sicily
Désirée Clary (1844–1859) Sweden and Norway
Dorothea of Brandenburg (1481–1495) Denmark and Norway
Dorothea of Saxe-Lauenburg (1559–1571) Denmark and Norway
Eadgifu of Kent (939–955) Wessex
Eadgifu of Wessex (936–951) West Francia
Ealhswith (899–902) Wessex
Eleanor of Alburquerque (1416–1435) Aragon
Eleanor of Aquitaine (1189–1204) England
Eleanor of Aragon (1438–1445) Portugal
Eleanor of England (1214) Castile
Elizabeth of Poland (1342–1380) Hungary
Eleanor of Provence (1272–1291) England
Eleonore Magdalene of Neuburg (1705–1720) Hungary and Bohemia
Elena of Montenegro (1946) Italy
Ælfthryth (978–1000) England
Elisabeth of Bavaria (1934–1951) Belgium
Elisabeth Farnese (1759–1766) Spain
Elisabeth Christine of Brunswick-Wolfenbüttel (1745–1750) Hungary and Bohemia
Elizabeth of Austria (1492–1505) Poland
Elizabeth of Bosnia (1382–1387) Hungary and Croatia
Elizabeth Bowes-Lyon (1952–2002) United Kingdom: the widow of King George VI and mother of Queen Elizabeth II. In some of the British media, Queen Elizabeth The Queen Mother was often referred to as the Queen Mum, and the term "Queen Mother" remained associated with her after her death.
Elizabeth the Cuman (1272–1290) Hungary
Elizabeth of Luxembourg (1440–1442) Bohemia and Hungary
Elizabeth of Aragon (1325–1336) Portugal
Elizabeth Woodville (1483) England
Emma of Italy (986–987) West Francia
Emma of Normandy (1035–1052) Denmark and England
Emma of Waldeck and Pyrmont (1890–1934) Netherlands
Ermengarde de Beaumont (1214–1233) Scotland
Estrid of the Obotrites (1022–1035) Sweden
Euphrosyne of Kiev (1162–1193) Hungary
Frederica of Hanover (1964–1973) Greece
Frederica Louisa of Hesse-Darmstadt (1797–1805) Prussia
Gayatri Devi (1919–2009) Jaipur (India)
Gayatri Rajapatni (1309–1350) Majapahit (Indonesia)
Gerberga of Saxony (954–984) West Francia
Giovanna of Italy (1943–1946) Bulgaria
Gunnhild, Mother of Kings (961–970) Norway
Hafsa Sultan (1520–1534) Ottoman Empire
Hamida Banu Begum (1556–1604) Mughal India
Handan Sultan (1603-1605) Ottoman Empire
Halime Sultan (1617-1623) Ottoman Empire
Halaevalu Mataʻaho ʻAhomeʻe (2006–2017) Tonga

Hedvig Eleonora of Holstein-Gottorp (1660–1697) Sweden
Hedwig of Holstein (1290–1318) Sweden
Helen of Greece and Denmark (1940–1948) Romania
Helena of Serbia (1141-1146) Hungary
Henrietta Maria of France (1649–1669) England and Scotland
Hortense de Beauharnais (1810) Holland
Huzaima bint Nasser (1933–1935) Iraq
Ingeborg of Denmark (1280-1287) Norway
Ingrid of Sweden (1972–2000) Denmark
Isabeau of Bavaria (1422–1435) France
Isabella II of Spain (1874–1885) Spain
Isabella of Angoulême (1216–1246) England
Isabella of France (1327–1358) England 
Isabella of Portugal (1474–1496) Portugal
Jadwiga of Kalisz (1333–1339) Poland
Joan Beaufort, Queen of Scots (1437–1445) Scotland
Jezebel (c.852–842 BC) Israel
Josephine of Leuchtenberg (1859–1876) Sweden and Norway
Jijabai (1598–1674) Maratha Empire (India)
Juana Manuel (1379–1381) Castile and León
Keōpūolani (1778–1823) Hawaii (United States)
Kesang Choden (1972–2006) Bhutan
Kösem Sultan (1623–1648) Ottoman Empire
Kunigunda of Halych (1278–1285) Bohemia
Louisa Ulrika of Prussia (1771–1782) Sweden
Louise of Sweden (1912–1926) Denmark
Luisa de Guzmán (1656–1666) Portugal
Margaret of Denmark (1380–1387) Norway
Margaret of Durazzo (1386–1412) Naples
Margaret Sambiria (1259–1282) Denmark
Margaret Tudor (1513–1541) Scotland 
Margaret of Provence (1270–1285) France
Margaret Skulesdatter (1263–1270) Norway
Margherita of Savoy (1900–1926) Italy
Maria of Austria (1576–1603) Hungary and Bohemia
María de Molina (1295–1312) Castile and León
Maria of Portugal (1350–1357) Castile and León
Maria of Romania (1934–1961) Yugoslavia
Maria Amalia of Saxony (1759–1760) Naples and Sicily
Maria Anna of Austria (1750–1754) Portugal
Maria Christina of Austria (1906–1929) Spain
Maria Christina of the Two Sicilies (1833–1868) Spain
Maria Eleonora of Brandenburg (1632–1654) Sweden
María Isabella of Spain (1830–1848) Two Sicilies
Maria Laskarina (1270) Hungary
Maria Leopoldina of Austria (1826) Portugal
Maria Luisa of Parma (1808–1819) Spain
Maria Luisa of Spain (1792) Hungary and Bohemia
Maria Pia of Savoy (1889–1908) Portugal
Maria Theresa (1765–1780) Germany
Mariam-uz-Zamani (1605–1623) Mughal India
Mariana of Austria (1665–1696) Spain
Mariana Victoria of Spain (1777–1781) Portugal 
Marie de Coucy (1249–1285) Scotland
Marie de' Medici (1610–1642) France
Marie of Anjou (1461–1463) France
Marie of Prussia (1864–1889) Bavaria
Marie of Edinburgh (1930–1938) Romania
Mary of Guelders (1460–1463) Scotland
Mary of Guise (1542–1560) Scotland
Mary of Teck (1936–1952) United Kingdom: widow of King George V and mother of kings Edward VIII and George VI. Queen Mary never used the title Queen Mother, because she thought it implied advancing years, choosing instead to be known as "Queen Mary" and that style was used to describe her in the Court Circular. But she was a queen mother just the same.
Mary, Queen of Scots (1567–1587) Scotland
Nana Afia Kobi Serwaa Ampem II (1999–2016) Ashanti people (Ghana)
Musbah bint Nasser (1951–1952) Jordan
Narriman Sadek (1952–1953) Egypt
Nazli Sabri (1936–1950) Egypt
Norodom Monineath (from 2004) Cambodia
Nurbanu Sultan (1578–1583) Ottoman Empire
Olga Constantinovna of Russia (1913–1922) Greece
Pauline Therese of Württemberg (1864–1873) Württemberg
Phuntsho Choden (1952–1972) Bhutan
Perestu Kadın (1876-1904) Ottoman Empire 
Ratna Rajya Lakshmi Devi Shah (1972–2008) Nepal
Richeza of Denmark (1216–1220) Sweden
Richeza of Poland (1074–1077) Hungary
Safiye Sultan (1595–1603) Ottoman Empire
Sancha of Castile (1196–1208) Aragon
Sancha of León (1065–1067) León
Saovabha Phongsri (1910–1919) Thailand
Sirikit (from 2016) Thailand
Sofía of Spain (from 2014) Spain
Sophia of Halshany (1434–1461) Poland
Sophia of Minsk (1182–1198) Denmark
Sophia of Nassau (1907–1913) Sweden
Sophia of Prussia (1917–1920, 1922–1936) Greece
Sophie of Mecklenburg-Güstrow (1588–1631) Denmark and Norway
Sophie Amalie of Brunswick-Calenberg (1670–1685) Denmark and Norway
Sophia Dorothea of Hanover (1740–1757) Prussia
Sophia Magdalena of Denmark (1792–1809) Sweden
Sophie Magdalene of Brandenburg-Kulmbach (1746–1766) Denmark and Norway
Tadj ol-Molouk (1941–1979) Persia (Iran)
Therese of Saxe-Hildburghausen (1848–1854) Bavaria
Tiye (14th century BC) Egypt
Tshering Yangdon (from 2006) Bhutan
Turhan Sultan (1651–1681) Ottoman Empire
Violant of Aragon (1284–1295) Castile and León
Victoria, Princess Royal (1888–1901) Prussia
Xiaoqinxian (1861-1908) Qing China
Zein al-Sharaf Talal (1952–1994) Jordan

Exceptional cases

Ingeborg of Norway (1301–1361), Duchess of Södermanland, acted and ranked as if she were a queen regnant for a year before the Swedish reign of her son, King Magnus IV, and thereafter as if she were his queen mother, serving intermittently on his board of regents. However, though she has been called the King Mother in biographical literature, she was never officially recognized as queen or queen mother.
Her granddaughter-in-law Margaret (1353–1412), who ruled all of Scandinavia as the mother of one king and the adoptive mother of another, held a similarly complicated unofficial position but for much longer, and in traditional history is given the title of Queen. Early in her career, she had been Queen consort of Norway for seventeen years and of Sweden for one year.
Jijabai (1598–1674) was neither consort of a ruling king nor a ruling queen or regent. In practical terms her husband Shahaji was a nobleman under other rulers, but her son founded an independent empire and became its sovereign. Hence she is given the title Queen Mother – Rajmata in Hindi.
Sadijé Toptani (1876–1934), mother of King Zog I of Albania: after her son became king in 1928 she was raised to the title Queen Mother of the Albanians (Nëna Mbretëreshë e Shqiptarëve) with the style of Her Majesty, a position she held from September 1, 1928, until her death.
Helen of Greece and Denmark was the wife of the future Carol II of Romania from 1921 to 1928, and mother of King Michael of Romania. Michael first ruled 1927–30, before his father was king, and again after his father abdicated. When in 1930 Carol returned to Romania and assumed the throne, he actually retrodated his reign to 1927, the year his father (King Ferdinand) died. As Helen had not yet divorced her playboy husband at the time (that was to happen in the following year), he unwittingly granted her the retroactive title of queen. Thus, in 1940, after his abdication and the second accession of their son, she rightfully became the queen mother of Romania.
Similarly, Gayatri Devi, Maharani of Jaipur (1919–2009) was the third wife of her husband, the monarch, but not the mother of his successor, a son by the king's first wife. However, she has been accorded the title of queen mother (Rajmata) anyway.
The Valide sultan or Sultana mother was title which usually held by the mother of the reigning Ottoman Sultan, even though she may never have been chief consort (haseki sultan).
Shubhadrangi was mother of future emperor Ashoka, but was murdered by Susima in order to save her daughter in law. She was not able to be empress mother (rajmata)
Helena Maurya, the second wife of Chandragupta Maurya, was step mother of Bindusara, and held the title of Rajmata until her death.

King father
The male equivalent of a queen mother, being a male former monarch or consort who is the father of the reigning monarch, is sometimes known as the "king father" or another variation based on the title of the monarch or consort. If a king abdicates and passes the throne to his child, or if a reigning queen abdicates or dies and is survived by her husband, he might acquire a substantive title.

Examples 
King Norodom Sihanouk of Cambodia was styled as "His Majesty King Father Norodom Sihanouk" when he abdicated the throne in favor of his son, Norodom Sihamoni.
Jigme Singye Wangchuck became the king father of Bhutan following his abdication in favor of his son, Jigme Khesar Namgyel Wangchuck.
Hamad bin Khalifa Al Thani became the "Father Emir" of Qatar following his abdication as emir in favor of his son, Tamim bin Hamad Al Thani.
After King Albert II of the Belgians abdicated in 2013, his style was shortened to His Majesty King Albert (as did King Leopold III); he is the father of King Philippe of Belgium.
After Sultan Omar Ali Saifuddien III of Brunei abdicated, he became the "Begawan Sultan" or the sultan father. He was given the title of "His Majesty The Sultan-Father", or in Malay, Duli Yang Teramat Mulia Paduka Seri Begawan Sultan, and this office became vacant when he died.
Francisco, Duke of Cádiz, the king consort of Isabel II of Spain, was king father to Alfonso XII of Spain.
Ferdinand II of Portugal, jure uxoris king to Maria II of Portugal, was king father to Pedro V of Portugal and Luís I of Portugal.
Following his abdication, Ludwig I of Bavaria was king father to Maximilian II of Bavaria.
In the former Chinese Empire, a living monarch who passed the throne to his son was called Taishang Huang. This title was last bestowed upon Qianlong Emperor.

Current comparisons
The following individuals hold a similar role as mothers or fathers of their country's reigning monarchs:
Ndlovukati Ntfombi of Eswatini (from 1986)
Beatrix of the Netherlands (from 2013)
King Albert II of Belgium (from 2013)
Queen Paola of Belgium (from 2013)
Father Emir of Qatar Sheikh Hamad bin Khalifa Al Thani (from 2013)
King Juan Carlos I of Spain (from 2014)
Queen Sofía of Spain (from 2014)
Queen Sirikit of Thailand (from 2016)
Queen Norodom the Queen Mother of Cambodia (from 2004)
Emperor Emeritus Akihito of Japan (from 2019)
Empress Emerita Michiko of Japan (from 2019)

See also
Mahd-i Ulya
Empress dowager
Valide sultan
Ndlovukati
Queen dowager

Notes

References

 Mother

Royal titles